Pritchard Gymnasium is a 1,970-seat, 20,000 square-foot multi-purpose gymnasium located within the Stony Brook Sports Complex in Stony Brook, New York. The gym opened in 1969 and is the current home for the Stony Brook Seawolves volleyball team.

History 
The Pritchard Gymnasium served as the original home for Stony Brook men's basketball from 1967 to 1990, until the Stony Brook Arena was opened in 1990. The Gymnasium underwent a $1.2 million renovation in the summer of 2008 and reopened in time for the 2009 Stony Brook women's volleyball season. The Gymnasium has been the home for several concerts, including Phish, The Notorious B.I.G., Primus, Red Hot Chili Peppers, Siouxsie and the Banshees, The Clash, and U2.

Stony Brook men's basketball returned to the Pritchard Gymnasium beginning in 2008 as the Stony Brook Arena underwent renovations. The America East Tournament Finals were held at Pritchard Gym in 2014. During the time when Stony Brook played home games at Pritchard, it played two postseason games at the otherwise dormant Stony Brook Arena: a 2010 NIT game against Illinois, and the 2012 America East Tournament Finals against Vermont. The team moved back into the Stony Brook Arena, which reopened as the Island Federal Credit Union Arena, in the fall of 2014.

The Gymnasium hosted the 2018 America East Tournament in volleyball, where No. 1 seed Stony Brook won the finals on their home court to advance to their second straight NCAA Tournament.

References

External links
Arena information

Indoor arenas in New York (state)
College basketball venues in the United States
Sports venues in Long Island
Basketball venues in New York (state)
Stony Brook Seawolves men's basketball
Sports venues in Suffolk County, New York
1969 establishments in New York (state)
Sports venues completed in 1969
College volleyball venues in the United States
Volleyball venues in New York (state)